Adolf Fyodorovich Laptev (18 November 1935 - 16 November 2005), was a Russian statesman and political figure, who had served as the 1st Governor (Head) of the Ivanovo Oblast from 1991 to 1996, as well as the chairman of the executive committee of the Ivanovo Regional Council, representing the Soviet Union from 1990 to 1991.

Biography
Adolf Laptev was born in Ivanovo on 18 November 1935.

He graduated from the Ivanovo Industrial College in 1954, and the Ivanovo Energy Institute in 1968.

Laptev worked as a senior and chief engineer of the municipal services department of the Ivanovo Oblast, and was at party work. From 1969 to 1974, he was chairman of the executive committee of the Ivanovo City Council, then, the Head of Glavivanovostroit, which was sent as a construction adviser to Laos.

From 1986 to 1987, he was the First Deputy Chairman of the Regional Agro-Industrial Committee and in 1987, Laptev became deputy chairman. From 1990 to 1991, he was chairman of the executive committee of the Ivanovo Regional Council of People's Deputies.

On 24 December 1991, Laptev became to 1st Governor (Head) of the Ivanovo Oblast. He was dismissed by President Boris Yeltsin on 22 January 1996. Laptev retired from politics in 2002.

He died in Ivanovo on 16 November 2005, at the age of 69.

References

External links
 Лаптев Адольф Федорович- detailed information. Reviews, real experiences of people like you
 Ордена

1935 births
2005 deaths
People from Ivanovo
20th-century Russian engineers
20th-century Russian politicians
Governors of Ivanovo Oblast